Greg Grant may refer to:

Greg Grant (basketball, born 1960) (born 1960), American basketball player
Greg Grant (basketball, born 1966) (born 1966), American basketball player

See also
Gregor Grant (1911–1969), Scottish artist